A Canary Cage is a 1983 Soviet drama film directed by Pavel Chukhray.

Plot 
The film tells about a guy and a girl who are experiencing a severe internal crisis. They are as if in a cage from which they can't get out.

Cast 
 Vyacheslav Baranov as Viktor
 Evgeniya Dobrovolskaya as Olesya
 Alisa Freyndlikh as Olesya's mother
 Boris Bachurin as Militiaman (as B. Bachurin)
 Semyon Farada as Attendant
 Valentina Ananina as Railroader
 Galina Komarova as Barmaid
 Aleksandr Konyashin as Bit part (as A. Konyashin)
 Mikhail Chigaryov as Bit part
 Velta Zygure as Conductor

References

External links 
 

1983 films
1980s Russian-language films
Soviet drama films
1983 drama films